The siege of Iwaya Castle (岩屋城の戦い) was fought in the year 1586 when an army of the Shimazu clan put the castle of Iwaya, which belonged to the Takahashi clan who were vassals of the Ōtomo clan, under siege.

After the defeat of the Ryūzōji clan at the Battle of Okitanawate in 1584, Shimazu Yoshihisa refocused his attentions on the Ōtomo clan and a campaign was started against their dominions. The siege of Iwaya Castle resulted after the Shimazu invasion of Chikuzen Province. The castellan of Iwaya was Takahashi Shigetane, one of the most trusted retainers of the Ōtomo, and held the fortress with a small garrison of around 763 soldiers. When the invading army of around 35,000 soldiers put the castle under siege the situation seemed untenable, but the castle managed to hold for two weeks. 

When Shigetane realized he could not hold the fortress any longer he committed seppuku and all soldiers suicide attack. The Shimazu took the castle and were impressed with Shigetane's loyal conduct; they are said to have prayed for his deceased spirit.

References 

Iwaya Castle 1586
1586 in Japan
Shimazu clan
Iwaya Castle 1586
Conflicts in 1586